Thursley, Hankley and Frensham Commons is a  biological Site of Special Scientific Interest west of Godalming in Surrey. Thursley Common is a national nature reserve. The site is a Special Protection Area and part of the Thursley, Ash, Pirbright & Chobham Special Area of Conservation.

This site is of national importance for its invertebrates, birds and reptiles. It is mainly heathland but the valley mire on Thursley Common is one of the best in the country. Orthoptera include the nationally rare large marsh grasshopper. The site is one of the richest in southern England for birds and of outstanding importance for reptiles, such as the nationally rare sand lizard.

See also
Thursley Common
Hankley Common
Frensham Common

References

Sites of Special Scientific Interest in Surrey
National nature reserves in England
Nature Conservation Review sites
Ramsar sites in England
 Special Areas of Conservation in England
Special Protection Areas in England